The Banshee class was a class of three torpedo boat destroyers that served with the Royal Navy into the early part of the Twentieth century.

As was typical for torpedo craft at the time, the Admiralty left detailed design to the builders, laying down only broad requirements.

The three ships, Banshee, Contest and Dragon were all ordered on 7 February 1894 to be built by Laird at Birkenhead. Displacing 290 tons, they carried one 12-pounder gun and five 6-pounder guns, plus two 18-inch torpedo tubes in a trainable twin deck mounting. With  they made a speed of 27 knots (50 km/h).

Banshee and Dragon were deployed to the Mediterranean in 1896 and remained there for the rest of their service lives, until coming home in 1911 to be paid off; Contest spent her whole service life in Home waters.

Along with the similar Ferret-class torpedo boat destroyers built under the 1892-1893 Programme, they were all disposed of in 1911/1912.

Ships
All three were built by Laird Brothers at Birkenhead (which was to become Cammell Laird & Co. in 1903)

See also
A-class destroyer (1913)

Bibliography

References

 
Destroyer classes
Ship classes of the Royal Navy